A24 is a film distribution, production and finance company.

A24, A-24 or A.24 may also refer to:

Transportation

Military 
 A-24 Banshee, World War II U.S. Army dive bomber
 Aero A.24, a Czech bomber design of the 1920s

Media and entertainment 
 A24 news channel, a pan-African 24-hour station starting broadcasting from Nairobi in 2008
 América 24, recently known as A24, an Argentine news cable TV channel

Other uses 
 British NVC community A24 (Juncus bulbosus community), a plant community
 English Opening, a chess opening where White plays 1.c4
 HLA-A24, an HLA-A serotype
 A24 trap used to kill pest or invasive rodents and marsupials

See also
 24A (disambiguation)